The Cessna 421 Golden Eagle is an American six or seven seat twin-engined light transport aircraft, developed in the 1960s by Cessna as a pressurized version of the earlier Cessna 411.

Development

The Cessna 421 was first produced in May 1967, the 1968 model year. It had "Stabila-Tip" fuel tanks on the wingtips (like the Cessna 310).  Its electro-mechanical landing gear are similar to that of the 310.  It was an immediate hit, selling 200 planes in its first year.

The very next year, 1969, the design was refined, with a three-inch stretch of the fuselage, five more gallons of fuel capacity, and a 40-pound increase in gross weight.  The plane was redesignated the Cessna 421A.

In 1971, the design was again improved.  Both empty and gross weight increased, the wingspan was increased by two feet, raising the service ceiling by 5,000 feet.  The nose was stretched two feet to accommodate a larger nose baggage section. This new plane is designated the Cessna 421B.

In 1975, the plane was offered with a package of equipment enabling flight into known icing conditions.

In 1976, the 421C appeared which featured wet wings, the absence of wingtip fuel tanks and landing gear that was changed from straight-leg to a trailing-link design from the 1981 model year onwards. Production ended in 1985 after 1,901 aircraft had been delivered.

The 421 was first certified on 1 May 1967 and shares a common type certificate with models 401, 402, 411, 414 and 425.

Some 421s have been modified to accept turboprop engines, making them very similar to the Cessna 425, which itself is a turboprop development of the 421.

Design
The 421 is an all-metal low-wing cabin monoplane with a retractable tricycle landing gear, and powered by two geared Continental GTSIO-520-D engines, wing-mounted in tractor configuration. The cabin is accessed from a door, on the left hand side behind the wing, and has seating for six on the basic 421, or up to ten on later variants.

Variants

421
Type approved 1 May 1967, powered by two Continental GTSIO-520-Ds of  each, maximum takeoff weight . 200 built.
421A
Type approved 19 November 1968, powered by two Continental GTSIO-520-Ds of  each, maximum takeoff weight . 158 built.
421B Golden Eagle/Executive Commuter
Eight-seat light passenger transport aircraft. Type approved 28 April 1970, powered by two Continental GTSIO-520-Hs of  each, maximum takeoff weight , later models . 699 built.
421C Golden Eagle/Executive Commuter
Model with new wing and landing gear. Type approved 28 October 1975, powered by two Continental GTSIO-520-Ls or Continental GTSIO-520-Ns of  each, maximum takeoff weight . 859 built.
Riley Turbine Rocket 421
Conversion of Cessna 421 aircraft by fitting two Lycoming LTP101 turboprop engines. Formal designation R421BL and R421CL for conversions of 421B and C respectively.
Riley Turbine Eagle 421
Conversion of Cessna 421C aircraft by fitting two 750hp Pratt & Whitney Canada PT6A-135 turboprop engines. Formal designation R421CP.
Excalibur 421
Re-engined 421C with Pratt & Whitney Canada PT6A-135A or PT6A-112 turboprops, supplemental type certificate held by Excalibur 421 LLC of Paso Robles, California. In 2013 it was announced that Aviation Alliance are acting as program managers for the Excalibur 421 upgrade programme.
Advanced Aircraft Regent 1500
Production of the Riley Turbine Eagle 421 conversion by Advanced Aircraft Corporation.

Military operators

Royal Bahamas Defence Force

 Bolivian Air Force at least one 421B was in use.

 Royal Cambodian Air Force

Ivory Coast Air Force

Royal New Zealand Air Force three 421C.
No. 42 Squadron RNZAF
 
Pakistan Army Aviation at least one 421 in use.

Turkish Army Aviation at least three 421Bs in use.

Air Force of Zimbabwe at least one 421A in use.

Specifications (C 421C)

See also

Notes

References

Bibliography

External links

421
1960s United States civil utility aircraft
Low-wing aircraft
Aircraft first flown in 1965
Twin piston-engined tractor aircraft